This is a partial list of molecules that contain 8 carbon atoms.

See also
 Carbon number 
 List of compounds with carbon number 7
 List of compounds with carbon number 9

C08